The women's 1500 metres competition at the 2018 European Speed Skating Championships was held on 5 January 2018.

Results
The race was started at 17:18.

References

Women's 1500 metres